Meilan often refers to Meilan District, a district in Haikou, China.

Meilan may also refer to:

People
Zeng Meilan, Chinese rower
José Luis Meilán Gil (1933-2018), Spanish politician

Meilan District
Haikou Meilan International Airport, airport serving Haikou
Meilan railway station, railway station of the Hainan Eastern Ring Railway that is connected to Haikou Meilan International Airport
Haikou Meilan International Airport (company), former owner and operator of the Haikou Meilan International Airport

Other
Meilan Lake station railway station of the Shanghai Metro

See also

Mei Lan, a giant panda born at Zoo Atlanta in Atlanta, Georgia
Melian (disambiguation)
Meilhan (disambiguation)
Meilin (disambiguation)
Milan (disambiguation)
Milan (given name)
Milan (surname)